ZELPO Aréna is a home football stadium in Podbrezová, Slovakia.  It is currently used mostly for football matches and is the home ground of ŽP Šport Podbrezová.  The stadium holds 4,061 people. The intensity of the floodlighting is 1,200 lux.

External links 
Stadium profile 
Football stadiums profile

Football venues in Slovakia
Buildings and structures in Banská Bystrica Region
Sport in Banská Bystrica Region
Sports venues completed in 1959
FK Železiarne Podbrezová